Hamouda Bashir (born 3 January 1984) is a Sudanese former footballer who played as a midfielder. He was a member of the Sudan national football team.

References

1984 births
Living people
Sudanese footballers
Sudan international footballers
People from Sennar (state)
Association football defenders
Al-Merrikh SC players
Al-Hilal Club (Omdurman) players
Al-Ahly Shendi players
El Hilal SC El Obeid players
2008 Africa Cup of Nations players